Robert Simonson (born September 11, 1964) is an American journalist and author.

Personal life
Robert Simonson was born in Wisconsin; he has lived in Brooklyn since 1988.

Career
Robert Simonson began writing about cocktails, spirits and bars for The New York Times in 2009. He has also written frequently for Imbibe, Whiskey Advocate, Saveur, Food & Wine and Lucky Peach. Since 2017, he has been a contributing editor at Punch. His book 3-Ingredient Cocktails was nominated for a James Beard Award. His other writings have been nominated for a total of 10 Spirited Awards, which are awarded annually by Tales of the Cocktail.

Prior to becoming a cocktail writer, he wrote about the theater for 15 years, primarily for The New York Times and Playbill, where he was an editor and writer for 16 years. He also wrote four books about the theater.

Bibliography

References

External links

Interview with Robert Simonson at TimeOut
Robert Simonson articles at The New York Times
Robert Simonson articles at Punch
Robert Simonson articles at Imbibe

American theater critics
American male journalists
Journalists from Wisconsin
1964 births
Living people
American food writers
The New York Times writers
20th-century American journalists
21st-century American journalists
Writers from Milwaukee
Drinking culture